Aaron Robinson (born November 10, 1998) is an American football cornerback for the New York Giants of the National Football League (NFL). He played college football at Alabama and UCF, and was drafted by the Giants in the third round of the 2021 NFL Draft.

Early life and high school
Robinson grew up in Deerfield Beach, Florida, and attended Deerfield Beach High School. He finished his senior season with 41 tackles, four interceptions and four pass break-ups and was named first-team All-Class 8A. He was a four-star recruit, per ESPN. Robinson initially committed to play college football at Florida before flipping his commitment to Alabama shortly before National Signing Day.

College career
Robinson began his collegiate career at Alabama. He played in 13 games as a true freshman as a reserve cornerback and on special teams. Robinson announced that he intended to transfer from Alabama during the summer before his sophomore year and ultimately chose to enroll at UCF.

Robinson sat out his first year with the Knights per NCAA transfer rules. He suffered a serious injury on the opening kickoff of his first game with the team and missed multiple weeks of his redshirt sophomore season. As a redshirt junior, Robinson recorded 54 tackles, 5.5 tackles for loss, three interceptions and 10 pass breakups with one forced fumble and was named second-team All-American Athletic Conference (AAC). Robinson was named second-team All-AAC again as a redshirt senior.

Professional career

Robinson was selected by the New York Giants in the third round (71st overall) of the 2021 NFL Draft. He signed his four-year rookie contract with New York on May 27, 2021. He was placed on the reserve/PUP list to start the 2021 season. He was activated on November 1, 2021.

On September 14, 2022, Robinson had his appendix removed and would not be able to play in Week 2 & 3 games against the Carolina Panthers and Dallas Cowboys. On October 4, 2022, Robinson was placed on injured reserve with a knee injury.

References

External links
UCF Knights bio

1998 births
Living people
Robinson, Aaron
Players of American football from Florida
Sportspeople from Broward County, Florida
American football cornerbacks
People from Deerfield Beach, Florida
UCF Knights football players
Alabama Crimson Tide football players
New York Giants players